Strong Enough is American country music artist Travis Tritt's eighth studio album, released on Columbia Records Nashville in 2002. The tracks "Strong Enough To Be Your Man" (an answer song to Sheryl Crow's 1995 single "Strong Enough") and "Country Ain't Country" were released as singles, respectively reaching #13 and #26 on the Billboard country charts.

Track listing

Personnel
Compiled from liner notes.
Musicians
 Eddie Bayers — percussion (track 7)
 Mike Brignardello — bass guitar (tracks 2, 5, 8-11)
 John Cowan — backing vocals (tracks 4, 9, 12)
 Lisa Cochran — backing vocals (tracks 1, 5, 9)
 Melodie Crittenden — backing vocals (tracks 2, 3, 4, 6, 10)
 Dan Dugmore — steel guitar
 Aubrey Haynie — fiddle
 Wes Hightower — backing vocals (track 11)
 John Barlow Jarvis — piano, keyboards
 Kirk "Jellyroll" Johnson — harmonica (track 5)
 Bob Mason — cello (track 8)
 Brent Mason — electric guitar
 Mac McAnally — acoustic guitar
 Greg Morrow — drums
 Marty Stuart — electric guitar (track 12)
 Neil Thrasher — backing vocals (tracks 1-3, 5, 6, 10)
 Travis Tritt — lead and backing vocals
 Billy Joe Walker Jr. — electric guitar (tracks 3, 4), acoustic guitar (tracks 4, 11)
Glenn Worf — bass guitar (tracks 1, 3, 4, 6, 7, 12)
 Curtis Young — backing vocals (track 8)
 Reggie Young — electric guitar
 Andrea Zonn — backing vocals (tracks 4, 11, 12)
Technical
Chuck Ainlay — mixing (except track 3)
Ed Seay — mixing (track 3 only)
 Steve Tillisch — recording
 Travis Tritt — production
 Billy Joe Walker, Jr. — production
 Bergen White — string arrangements

Charts

Weekly charts

Year-end charts

References

2002 albums
Columbia Records albums
Travis Tritt albums
Albums produced by Billy Joe Walker Jr.